The 2020–21 season was the 119th season in the existence of Stade Rennais and the club's 27th consecutive season in the top flight of French football. In addition to the domestic league, Rennes participated in this season's edition of the Coupe de France and entered the UEFA Champions League for the first time in the group stage as a result of finishing in third place during the previous Ligue 1 season. The season covered the period from 1 July 2020 to 30 June 2021.

Players

First-team squad
.

Out on loan

Transfers

In

Out

Pre-season

Competitions

Overall record

Ligue 1

League table

Results summary

Results by round

Matches
The league fixtures were announced on 9 July 2020.

Coupe de France

UEFA Champions League

Group stage

The group stage draw was held on 1 October 2020.

Statistics

Appearances and goals

|-
! colspan=14 style=background:#dcdcdc; text-align:center| Goalkeepers

|-
! colspan=14 style=background:#dcdcdc; text-align:center| Defenders

|-
! colspan=14 style=background:#dcdcdc; text-align:center| Midfielders

|-
! colspan=14 style=background:#dcdcdc; text-align:center| Forwards

|-
! colspan=14 style=background:#dcdcdc; text-align:center| Players transferred out during the season

Goalscorers

Notes

References

External links

Stade Rennais F.C. seasons
Rennes
Rennes